Greece competed at the 2012 Summer Olympics in London, United Kingdom, from 27 July to 12 August 2012. The Hellenic Olympic Committee sent a total of 103 athletes to the Games in London, 65 men and 38 women, to compete in 19 sports. Men's water polo was the only team event in which Greece was represented at these Olympic Games.

As the progenitor nation of the Olympic games and in keeping with tradition, Greece entered first during the opening ceremony, led by taekwondo jin Alexandros Nikolaidis, two-time Olympic silver medalist in men's super heavyweight division.

Greece failed to win a gold or a silver medal for the first time since 1988 Summer Olympics in Seoul. Only two bronze medals were awarded to the team: one in judo, by Ilias Iliadis, an Olympic gold medalist at the 2004 Summer Olympics in Athens, and the other in rowing, by Alexandra Tsiavou (sixth in Beijing), and Christina Giazitzidou.

Several athletes missed out of the medal standings in the finals, including swimmer Spyridon Gianniotis (fourth in the open water marathon), the Men's coxle four team (finished in the fourth place),  Vassiliki Vougiouka (missed out the semi-finals in fencing), sailor Byron Kokkalanis, (sixth in men's windsurfing) and gymnast Vasileios Tsolakidis (sixth in men's parallel bars).

Medalists

| width=78% align=left valign=top |

| width=22% align=left valign=top |

Archery

Greece qualified one archer.

Athletics

Greek athletes achieved qualifying standards in the following athletics events (up to a maximum of 3 athletes in each event at the 'A' Standard, and 1 at the 'B' Standard):

Men
Track & road events

Field events

Women
Track & road events

Field events

Combined events – Heptathlon

Canoeing

Slalom
Greece has qualified boats for the following events

Cycling

Road

Track
Sprint

Keirin

Mountain biking

Diving

Fencing

Greece qualified 1 fencer.

Gymnastics

Artistic
Greece qualified three athletes.
Men

Women

Rhythmic

Judo

Greece qualified 2 judokas.

Rowing

Greece qualified the following boats.

Men

Women

Qualification Legend: FA=Final A (medal); FB=Final B (non-medal); FC=Final C (non-medal); FD=Final D (non-medal); FE=Final E (non-medal); FF=Final F (non-medal); SA/B=Semifinals A/B; SC/D=Semifinals C/D; SE/F=Semifinals E/F; QF=Quarterfinals; R=Repechage

Sailing

Greece qualified 1 boat for each of the following events

Men

Women

Open

M = Medal race; EL = Eliminated – did not advance into the medal race

Shooting

Greece qualified for three quota places in shooting;

Swimming

Greek swimmers achieved qualifying standards in the following events (up to a maximum of 2 swimmers in each event at the Olympic Qualifying Time (OQT), and potentially 1 at the Olympic Selection Time (OST)):

Men

Women

Synchronized swimming

Greece qualified 2 quota places in synchronized swimming.

Table tennis

Greece qualified two athletes for singles table tennis events. Based on their world rankings as of 16 May 2011 Kalinikos Kreanga and Panagiotis Gionis qualified for the men's event.

Taekwondo

Alexandros Nikolaidis had ensured a quota place for Greece in the men's +80 kg by reaching the top 3 of the 2011 WTF World Qualification Tournament.

Volleyball

Beach

Water polo

Greece has qualified a men's team.

Men's tournament

Team roster

Group play

Weightlifting

Wrestling

Greece qualified in the following events.

Men's freestyle

Women's freestyle

References

External links

Website of Greek Olympic Committee and Team Greece

Summer Olympics
2012
Nations at the 2012 Summer Olympics